Our Hong Kong Foundation is a Hong Kong think tank established in 2014 by former chief executive Tung Chee-hwa. It conducts research in land, housing, economic development, innovation and technology, social innovation, mainland/Hong Kong economies, art innovation, and aging society. Its stated mission is to "study public policies that affect Hong Kong’s overall interests, identify sustainable solutions to meet its future development needs and advocate to promote social consensus".

In the University of Pennsylvania's 2016 Global Go To Think Tanks Report, Our Hong Kong Foundation ranked the highest amongst all Hong Kong-based think tanks and listed in the Think Tank to Watch in 2017 achievement category.

Political view 
Given the establishment by Tung Chee-hwa, a vice-chairman of the Chinese People's Political Consultative Conference (CPPCC), Our Hong Kong Foundation may have political views biased towards the Chinese Communist Party and the Hong Kong government, as suggested by some media.

Publications 
The Foundation maintains a wide-ranging news website, ThinkHK.

Other research and advocacy publications include (in approximately chronological order):
 Maximizing Land Use to Boost Development, Optimizing Housing Resources to Benefit All 
The Ecosystem of Innovation and Technology in Hong Kong
Social innovation for a Better Hong Kong (2016)
 Riding on Mainland’s Economic Development in a New Era
 Unleashing Our Museums, Reforms Toward a New Governance Model An Investment for the Celebration of Aging Rethinking Public Housing Policy, Building Sustainable Land Reserve Yes, Hong Kong CAN! (about economic development)
 From Large-Scale Reclamation to an Ideal Home''

References 

Think tanks based in Hong Kong
Foundations based in Hong Kong